Colón Fútbol Club is a football club from Montevideo in Uruguay. The club was established on March 12, 1907, and is affiliated with the second division B of the Uruguayan Football Association.

Title s
Segunda División (2): 1964, 1982
Segunda División Amateur (2): 1988, 2000
 Divisional Intermedia (4): 1925, 1927, 1931, 1954
División Extra (1): 1920
 Segunda División (1): 1908
 Liga Uruguaya de Football Amateur (1): 1933

Women's team 
The women's team of Colon has won four national championships from 2013 to 2016. They also played in the Copa Libertadores Femenina from 2014 to 2017, achieving a fourth place finish in 2016.

References

External links
Official website

Football clubs in Uruguay
Association football clubs established in 1907
Sport in Montevideo
1907 establishments in Uruguay
Brazo Oriental